Shegoashkwu is a former Karok settlement in Del Norte County, California, below Orleans (then Orleans Bar), on the Klamath River. Its precise location is unknown.

References

Karuk villages
Former settlements in Del Norte County, California
Former Native American populated places in California
Lost Native American populated places in the United States